Deal sourcing or deal origination is a term used by finance professionals such as private equity investors and investment bankers to describe the process by which firms identify investment opportunities. The term can apply to venture capital or private equity. Ensuring that a larger volume of deals are sourced is imperative to keeping up a viable deal flow.

Thus, most venture capitalists, private equity investors, and investment bankers use various methods and origination strategies to source deals. While some firms reach out to teams of specialists to help with the deal sourcing process, others may use in-house resources. Investment banks usually provide deals to both the buy-side and the sell-side. Both buy-side and sell-side opportunities are sourced.

Traditional approach 
Deal origination largely depended on a broad network of contacts and a good reputation. Having an industry-specific knowledge and an idea of similar deals taking place in the market was considered an added advantage with respect to placing a bid.

The traditional deal origination method establishes direct relationships with owners of companies. Private equity firms focus efforts on certain industry verticals or sub-sectors based on fund mandates and portfolio composition. Buyers may cultivate these relationships directly, engage a specialized third party to proceed with a proactive approach, or rely on passive methods including online deal sharing forums, or sell-side processes. Specialized third parties consist of buy-side consulting firms.

Online deal sourcing 
Traditional methods of deal origination are fast giving way to online deal sourcing platforms for buy-side and sell-side opportunities. Several financial technology companies around the world provide services to users to enable them to go beyond their network of contacts and source deals on the basis of a variety of criteria. In addition, online deal sourcing is considered vital in M&A transactions. There are various online deal sourcing platforms available.

See also 
 Private equity firm
 Project finance

References

External links 
The definition of Deal sourcing on Divestopedia

Venture capital
Private equity
Private equity firms
Financial technology
Financial technology companies